The Taymura is a river that runs to the west of Central Siberia in Evenkiysky District, Krasnoyarsk Krai, Russia. It is a left tributary of the Nizhnyaya Tunguska.

The source of the river is the confluence of the Severnaya (North) Taymura and Yuzhnaya (South) Taymura. It flows in a wide valley across the Central Siberian Plateau. The river freezes in October and flows under the ice until May. Snow and rain feed the river.

The largest tributaries are the following rivers: Charveya, Unary, Delingdeken, Kerboku, Dyelingdeken, Detkekte, Siki, Neptenne and Varheme.

Kerbo, the only village on the river, has been uninhabited since Soviet times.

References

Rivers of Krasnoyarsk Krai